Komikado Shrine (小御門神社, Komikado jinja) is a Shinto shrine located in Narita, Chiba Prefecture, Japan. Its main festival is held annually on April 29. It was founded in 1882, and enshrines the kami of Kazan'in Morokata. It is one of the Fifteen Shrines of the Kenmu Restoration.

See also
Fifteen Shrines of the Kenmu Restoration

External links
Official website

Shinto shrines in Chiba Prefecture
1882 establishments in Japan
Narita, Chiba

Beppyo shrines